Utopia is an American science fiction drama television series adapted by Gillian Flynn from the 2013 British original series of the same name. It was released on September 25, 2020, on the Amazon Prime Video streaming service.

In November 2020, the series was canceled after one season of eight episodes.

Premise
A group of young adults and a boy get ahold of Utopia, a cult underground comic book, which not only pins them as the target of a shadowy organization, but also burdens them with the dangerous task of saving the world. The titular comic is the conclusion of Dystopia, of which the group members are fans and believe it to contain clairvoyant information about diseases that have already struck the world.

Synopsis:  The comic book fans discover a global conspiracy.  The comic book contains clues of future events because it is written by one of the architects of a plan designed to prevent ecological disaster as the Earth's population rises and resources are depleted.  The plan consists of:  (1) Convincing the world's population that there is an outbreak of a deadly new virus, (2) Once convinced of the narrative of the faux-pandemic, announce to the public the creation of a new vaccine, (3) Through the coordination between global elites and non-governmental organizations, governments move quickly to inject the world's population with this "vaccine". (4) Once the population is injected, it turns out that the vaccine is designed to sterilize almost all of those people that take it, causing the global population to drop from 7.8 billion to about 500 million, and ushering in a new era of plenty.

Cast and characters

Main
 John Cusack as Kevin Christie
 Ashleigh LaThrop as Becky Todd
 Dan Byrd as Ian Ackerman
 Desmin Borges as Wilson Wilson
 Jessica Rothe as Samantha
 Christopher Denham as Arby / John Hyde
 Javon Walton as Grant Bishop
 Farrah Mackenzie as Alice
 Cory Michael Smith as Thomas Christie
 Jeanine Serralles as Colleen Stearns
 Rainn Wilson as Michael Stearns
 Sasha Lane as Jessica Hyde

Recurring
 Felisha Terrell as Hailey Alvez
 Fiona Dourif as Cara Frostfield
 Dustin Ingram as Tallman
 Michael B. Woods as Rod
 Crystal Fox as Kim
 Rebecca Spence as Laura Christie
 Sonja Sohn as Katherine Milner
 Tim Hopper as Dale Warwick
 Hadley Robinson as Charlotte and Lily
 Calum Worthy as Ethan

Episodes

Production

Development
Utopia was ordered direct-to-series on April 19, 2018, with an order of nine episodes. It had originally been set up at HBO with David Fincher to direct, but was never produced after a financial dispute. On April 19, 2018, Utopia was ordered to series by Amazon. On July 23, 2020, during the San Diego Comic-Con@Home, the first teaser for the series was released and was confirmed to be released in the fourth quarter of 2020. On August 6, 2020, at the TCA virtual panel, showrunner Gillian Flynn announced that there would be less violence than in the British original. The series was released on September 25, 2020. On November 27, 2020, Amazon canceled the series after one season.

Filming
In June 2018, it was announced the series would start filming by the fourth quarter of 2018. On August 8, 2018, it was announced the series would consist of nine episodes, and probably have three different directors at work, one every three episodes, although it was later confirmed that there would be eight episodes in the first season. Flynn stated, "It won’t have a single director the entire way through. I think we’ll probably have multiple directors. It’s nine episodes, so I think we’ll do it in blocks of three, three and three, and not one director, the whole time through."

On October 16, 2019, the creator of the show, Gillian Flynn, announced that the series' filming was completed.

On August 10, 2020, it was revealed that Jeff Russo would compose the music for the series.

Casting
During its initial development in 2015, the cast included Rooney Mara, Colm Feore, Eric McCormack, Dallas Roberts, Jason Ritter, Brandon Scott and Agyness Deyn.

In January 2019, Sasha Lane joined the cast of the series. In February 2019, Rainn Wilson, Dan Byrd, Cory Michael Smith, Ashleigh LaThrop, Desmin Borges, Farrah Mackenzie, and Christopher Denham joined the cast of the series. In April 2019, John Cusack and Jeanine Serralles joined the cast of the series. In May 2019, Jessica Rothe, Felisha Terrell and Dustin Ingram joined the cast in recurring roles.

Reception

Many reviews from critics and audiences were critical of the poor timing of the release of the show with the COVID-19 pandemic, its level of violence, and negative comparisons to the original. Positive marks were given to the pacing and twists in the plot. On Rotten Tomatoes, the series holds an approval rating of 51% based on 47 reviews, with an average rating of 6.20/10, with the 16 top critics giving it a 5.40 (out of 10) and an approval rating of 36%. The site's critical consensus reads, "Utopia's cast and mystery at times transcend its overtly cynical and overly violent tendencies, but even those willing to look past the torture may find the whole thing too timely — in a bad way." On Metacritic, the series has a weighted average score of 56 out of 100 based on 19 reviews, indicating "mixed or average reviews".

References

External links
 
 
 

2020 American television series debuts
2020 American television series endings
2020s American drama television series
2020s American science fiction television series
American television series based on British television series
English-language television shows
Amazon Prime Video original programming
Overpopulation fiction
Television series by Amazon Studios
Television series by Endemol